John O’Farrell is an Irish venture capitalist at the Silicon Valley firm Andreessen Horowitz, which he joined in June 2010 as its third general partner. He serves on the boards of PagerDuty, Slack, Factual, GoodData, Granular, IFTTT, ItsOn and the Second Harvest Food Bank of Santa Clara and San Mateo Counties.

Early life and education
O'Farrell is from Stillorgan in south Dublin. Born in Ireland, O’Farrell has a Bachelor of Electronic Engineering from University College Dublin and an MBA from the Stanford Graduate School of Business, where he graduated as an Arjay Miller Scholar.

Early career
From 1997 to 2001, O’Farrell was Senior Vice President of International for @Home Network (later Excite@Home), where he led the launch of broadband Internet services through joint venture subsidiaries in the Benelux countries,  Australia and Japan. Prior to @Home, O’Farrell held general management, marketing and consulting positions in the United States and Europe with US WEST, Telecom Ireland, Booz Allen Hamilton, the European Commission, Digital Equipment Corp. and Siemens.

From 2001 to 2007, O’Farrell was Executive Vice President, Business Development for Opsware Inc., which was initially known as Loudcloud and was one of the first companies to offer Software as a Service and cloud computing services. With CEO Ben Horowitz, O’Farrell negotiated Loudcloud's 2002 exit from the services business and its emergence as a server automation software company named Opsware with a $52 million initial contract from EDS. Over the subsequent five years, O’Farrell led the expansion of Opsware's product line into asset-management, networking,  storage and runbook automation through four acquisitions as well as overseas partnerships with NEC Corp. and NTT Communications. In February 2006, O’Farrell negotiated Opsware's multi-million dollar distribution agreement with Cisco Systems, which was generating $5 million in quarterly revenue for Cisco by Q4 of that year. O’Farrell and Horowitz orchestrated a process involving 10 potential acquirers that resulted in the sale of Opsware to Hewlett-Packard for $1.65 billion in June 2007.

O’Farrell joined smart grid networking company Silver Spring Networks in January 2008 as Executive Vice President, Business Development. O’Farrell led the company's $90 million Series D fundraising led by Kleiner Perkins and Google; its expansion into Europe, Latin America and Asia; and its acquisition of Greenbox Technology.

He became the first non-founding partner of Andreessen Horowitz in 2010, and according to the Irish Times, he "quietly [rose] to become one of Ireland’s most senior figures in the technology world." In 2013, he moved out of investing and into an advisory role. In 2019, he is a board member at Slack, although without board voting rights.

Philanthropy
In April 2012, O'Farrell along with Andreessen Horowitz General Partners Marc Andreessen, Ben Horowitz, Peter J. Levine, Jeff Jordan, and Scott Weiss pledged to give half of their lifetime income from venture capital to charity.

References

External links

 Andreessen Horowitz Website
 John O'Farrell's Blog

Living people
20th-century Irish people
21st-century Irish people
American computer businesspeople
American venture capitalists
Irish financial businesspeople
Year of birth missing (living people)
Stanford Graduate School of Business alumni
American philanthropists
Irish emigrants to the United States
Andreessen Horowitz